In the field of enzymology, a glycerophospholipid arachidonoyl-transferase (CoA-independent) is an enzyme that catalyzes the chemical reaction:

1-organyl-2-arachidonoyl-sn-glycero-3-phosphocholine + 1-organyl-2-lyso-sn-glycero-3-phosphoethanolamine  1-organyl-2-arachidonoyl-sn-glycero-3-phosphoethanolamine + 1-organyl-2-lyso-sn-glycero-3-phosphocholine

This enzyme catalyzes the transfer of arachidonic acid and other polyenoic fatty acids from intact choline or ethanolamine-containing glycerophospholipids to the sn-2 position of a lyso- glycerophospholipid. The organyl group on sn-1 of the donor or acceptor molecule can be alkyl, acyl or alk-1-enyl.  This enzyme belongs to the family of transferases, specifically those acyltransferases transferring groups other than aminoacyl groups.

Nomenclature 

The systematic name of this enzyme class is 1-organyl-2-arachidonoyl-sn-glycero-3-phosphocholine:1-organyl-2-lys o-sn-glycero-3-phosphoethanolamine arachidonoyltransferase (CoA-independent).

References

 
 

EC 2.3.1
Enzymes of unknown structure